Louis S. Ciccarello is an American retired politician and lawyer.

Ciccarello was elected to a single term on the Connecticut Senate in 1974, representing the 25th district as a Democrat. He earned a J.D. degree from Stanford University Law School, then practiced law from 1965 to 2018. Ciccarello had a daughter, Lynne, and a son, Matthew. Matthew died in 2012 at the age of 43.

References

Living people
Year of birth missing (living people)
20th-century American lawyers
20th-century American politicians
21st-century American lawyers
Democratic Party Connecticut state senators
Connecticut lawyers
Stanford Law School alumni
Politicians from Norwalk, Connecticut